Terwilliger can refer to:

People and fictional characters
 Brian J. Terwilliger (born 1976), movie director
 G. Zachary Terwilliger (born 1981), former United States Attorney for the Eastern District of Virginia
 George J. Terwilliger III (born 1950), former United States Deputy Attorney General
 George Terwilliger (1882–1970), American silent film director and screenwriter
 Joseph Terwilliger, American geneticist
 Robert Underdunk Terwilliger or Sideshow Bob, a fictional character from The Simpsons
 Ron Terwilliger (born 1941), American housing developer
 Wayne Terwilliger (1925–2021), American baseball player, second baseman in Major League Baseball

Places in the United States
 Terwilliger, Portland, Oregon, a neighborhood
 Terwilliger Boulevard, a major road and parkway in Portland, Oregon
 Cougar Hot Springs, also known as Terwilliger Hot Springs, geothermal pools in Oregon

Buildings in the United States
 Terwilliger House, Registered Historic Place in McHenry County, Illinois
 Terwilliger House (Shawangunk, New York), a Federal style stone house built around the turn of the 18th century 
 Terwilliger Brothers Field at Max Bishop Stadium, a baseball stadium at the United States Naval Academy, Annapolis, Maryland

Dutch-language surnames